Hold Tight may refer to:

Music

Albums
Hold Tight, by David Pomeranz, 2007
Hold Tight, by Gregory Isaacs, 1997

Songs
"Hold Tight" (Bread song), 1977; covered by Vicki Sue Robinson (1977)
"Hold Tight" (Change song), 1981
"Hold Tight" (Dave Dee, Dozy, Beaky, Mick & Tich song), 1966
"Hold Tight" (Justin Bieber song), 2013
"Hold Tight" (Madonna song), 2015
"Hold Tight" (Sidney Bechet song) 1938; covered by The Andrews Sisters (1938) and Fats Waller (1939)
"Hold Tight", by Bootsauce from Bull, 1992
"Hold Tight", by Evelyn "Champagne" King from I'll Keep a Light On, 1995
"Hold Tight", by Greg Johnson
"Hold Tight", by Liverpool Express from Tracks, 1976
"Hold Tight", by Mark Geary
"Hold Tight", by Ratt from Collage, 1997
"Hold Tight", by Sabrina Carpenter from Singular: Act I, 2018
"Hold Tight", by Slum Village from Fantastic, Vol. 2, 2000

Other uses
Hold Tight (film), by Jack White, 1923
Hold Tight (novel), by Harlan Coben, 2008
Hold Tight!, a British pop/game show presented by Bob Carolgees

See also
Hold Tight, It's Lena, an album by Lena Zavaroni
Hold Me Tight (disambiguation)
Hold On Tight (disambiguation)